Ariston Holding NV is an Italian corporation (whose legal seat was transferred to the Netherlands in 2021) that produces heating systems and related products, marketed mainly under the Ariston, Chaffoteaux, Elco, Racold, Régent, Atag, NTI, HTP, Cuenod, Ecoflam and Thermowatt brands.

History 
In 1930, Aristide Merloni founded Industrie Merloni in the Marches and began producing scales. The production of electric water heaters dates back to 1960, with the appearance of the Ariston brand, which would propel the Group to leader status in this sector in Italy with the dawn of the 1970s.

Following the success of Ariston heaters, in the 1980s the company decided to enter the space heating sector and started manufacturing boilers.

During the 1990s the company opened its first branches in Eastern Europe and Asia. In the same years Ariston Thermo acquired Racold, India's largest water heaters' manufacturer, and opened its first wholly owned plant in China.

The early 21st century saw the acquisition in 2001 of several historical companies and brands in the heating and burner sectors, namely: Chaffoteaux, Elco, Cuenod and Rendamax.

Over the two-year period 2004–2005, new plants were inaugurated in Hanoi and St Petersburg, while the acquisition of Ecoflam was completed, the latter among Italy's leading companies for heating systems; in 2008, after the acquisition of Termogamma SA, specialised in the production of heat pumps, the company opened its European centre of excellence for solar heating systems in Italy, in Serra de' Conti.
In 2009, the company (until then part of MTS Group) changed its name to Ariston Thermo.
Ariston Thermo acquired in 2011 Cipag SA and Domotec AG, leaders in Switzerland for the production, distribution and maintenance of water heating systems.

2013 saw the acquisition of DhE, an Italian company specialised in heating elements for commercial and industrial applications, and the set up of a joint venture for the production and commercialisation in Uzbekistan of domestic heating systems.

In 2014, the company entered the South African market directly through the acquisition of Heat Tech Geysers, the country's second player for water heaters, and inaugurated an electric water heater factory in Vietnam.
In the same year it also strengthened its presence in mature markets with the acquisition of ATAG Heating, a Dutch high-end brand in the heating industry.

In April 2015, signed the acquisition of Gastech-Energi A/S, a leading company in the field of domestic and industrial heating in Denmark, announced during the inauguration in Russia of a new logistics center of approximately 10,000 m² in the production site of Vsevolozhsk, nearby St. Petersburg.

In September 2016, Ariston Thermo announced the acquisition of the majority stake in NY Thermal Inc., a company based in Saint John (Canada), operating in the domestic and commercial NTI branded condensing boilers in Canada and the United States.

During 2017 the Group completed two further acquisitions, one in the United States of America, where in August Ariston Thermo acquired HTP, a leading company in this market for thermal comfort solutions, and the other in Israel in October acquiring ATMOR Group, a leading company in the technology of electric instantaneous water heaters.

Also in 2017 two Ariston products - the instant electric water heater Aures Luxury Round and the brand new Lydos Hybrid, the first Class A hybrid electric water heater - were won the GOOD DESIGN ™ awards in the "Bath & Accessories" and "Building materials" categories”. The 2017 Ariston’s victories follow the one archived in 2016 with the state-of-the-art gas boiler Alteas, awarded due to its innovative silhouette and its fine materials, impeccable details and user-friendliness

Figures 
In 2016, Ariston Thermo sold 7 million products in over 150 countries worldwide, amounting to a turnover of 1.43 billion Euro.

It employs 6,900 people working in 59 companies, with 8 representative offices in 36 countries.

Brands
 Ariston
 Elco Heating Solutions (founded as Emile Looser Company)
 Chaffoteaux
 Racold
Régent
 ATAG (ATAG Heating Group founded by Antoon Tijdink and Antoon van Goor)
 NTI
 HTP
 Cuenod
 Ecoflam
 Thermowatt

See also 

 Aerothermal
 Ariston
 Aristide Merloni
 Francesco Merloni
 Vittorio Merloni
 Hotpoint
 Indesit
 Solar thermal energy

References

External links 

Heating, ventilation, and air conditioning companies
Home appliance manufacturers of Italy
Manufacturing companies established in 1930
Italian companies established in 1930
Italian brands
Fabriano
Companies based in le Marche
Multinational companies headquartered in Italy
Solar thermal energy